James or Jim Walker may refer to:

British politicians
Sir James Walker, 2nd Baronet (1829–1899), British MP for Beverley
James Walker (colonial administrator) (1809–1885), Scottish colonial administrator
James Walker (Labour politician) (1883–1945), British MP for Newport and Motherwell
James Walker of Richmondhill (1837–c.1910), Scottish businessman and Lord Provost of Aberdeen

Canadian politicians
James Walker (Alberta politician) (1874–?), Canadian politician from Alberta
James Walker (Canadian judge) (1756–1800), English-born lawyer, judge and politician in Lower Canada
James Edgar Walker (1911–1989), Canadian politician from Ontario
James H. Walker (1885–1954), Canadian politician in Alberta

Australian politicians
James Walker (Australian politician) (1841–1923), Scottish-born Australian banker and politician
James Walker (New South Wales politician) (1785–1856), member of the New South Wales Legislative Council
James Walker (Queensland politician) (1869–1939), lawyer; member of the Queensland Legislative Assembly for Ipswich

US politicians
James A. Walker (1832–1901), American military officer and politician
James B. Walker (1812–1877), American politician in Michigan
James D. Walker (1830–1906), American politician from Arkansas
James Lorenzo Walker (1920–2003), American politician from Florida
James N. Walker, member of the California State Assembly
James P. Walker (1851–1890), American politician from Missouri
Jimmy Walker (1881–1946), mayor of New York City

Sports

American
James J. Walker (American football) (1918–1975), American college football player and coach
James Walker (American football player) (1890–1973), American football player on the 1910 College Football All-America Team
James Walker (American football coach) (born 1944), American college football coach for the Kentucky Thorobreds
James Walker (hurdler) (born 1957), American hurdler
Jim Walker (American football coach) (born 1944), American football player and coach

Rest of world
James Walker (alpine skier) (1926–1996), Australian Olympic skier
James Walker (Australian footballer) (born 1979), Australian rules footballer
James Walker (canoeist) (born 1971), Australian sprint canoeist
James Walker (cricketer, born 1981), English cricketer
James Walker (cyclist) (1897–?), South African Olympic cyclist
James Walker (footballer, born 1987), English footballer
James Walker (racing driver) (born 1983), Jersey-born British racing driver
James Walker (rower) (born 1949), Canadian Olympic rower
James Walker (runner) (born 1954), Guamanian marathon runner
James Walker (sportsman) (1859–1923), Scottish rugby footballer and cricketer
James Higgs-Walker (1892–1979), English cricketer
Jim Walker (darts player) (born 1959), Scottish darts player
Jim Walker (English footballer) (born 1947), English footballer
Jim Walker (Scottish footballer) (1893–?), Scottish footballer
Jim Walker (rower) (born 1968), British Olympic rower

Writers
James Walker (writer/filmmaker) (born 1979), British writer and filmmaker
James Walker (television writer) (1973–2015), Australian television writer
James L. Walker (1845–1904), American individualist anarchist and writer

Musicians
James Walker (conductor) (1913–1988), Australian record producer and conductor
Jim Walker (drummer) (born 1955), Canadian drummer for the UK band Public Image Ltd
Jim Walker (flautist), American flutist and educator

Artists
James Alexander Walker (painter) (1831–1898), British painter of French descent
James F. Walker (1913–1994), American graphic artist
James Walker (engraver) (1748–1808), British mezzotint engraver

Science & medicine 
James Walker (physician) (1720–1789), British physician
James John Walker (entomologist) (1851–1939), English entomologist
James Walker (chemist) (1863–1935), Scottish chemist
James Walker (engineer) (1781–1862), Scottish civil-engineer
James Pattison Walker (1823–1906), British surgeon in the Indian Medical Service

Other fields
James Walker (actor) (1940–2017), British actor
James Walker (bishop) (1770–1841), Anglican Bishop of Edinburgh
James Walker (Harvard) (1794–1874), American minister and educator, president of Harvard College
James Walker (Royal Navy officer) (1764–1831), British naval officer
James Walker (Surveyor General) (1826–1896), Anglo-Indian surveyor general of India
James Backhouse Walker (1841–1899), Australian solicitor and historian
James Campbell Walker (1821–1888), Scottish architect
James Flood Walker (1868–1924), American architect
Jimmie Walker (born 1947), American comedian and actor
James Dent Walker (1928–1993), founder and president of the Afro-American Historical and Genealogical Society
James C. Walker (1843-1923), American soldier and Medal of Honor recipient
James Alonzo Walker, American aviator
James Hamlin Walker, New Zealand politician, mayor of Dunedin
James W. St. G. Walker, Canadian professor of history
Colonel James Walker, Canadian policeman, military officer and pioneer

See also
Jimmy Walker (disambiguation)
Jamie Walker (disambiguation)
Mount James Walker, in Alberta Canada
James Walker Log House, in Texas, United States
James Walker Nursing School Quarters in North Carolina, United States
James E. Walker Library, in Tennessee, United States

Walker (surname)